Parateleopus microstomus is a species of jellynose fish found in the waters of the Pacific Ocean around Indonesia.  This species is the only described species in the genus Parateleopus.

References
 

Ateleopodiformes
Monotypic fish genera
Fish of the Pacific Ocean
Fish described in 1912